The Kelpies are  horse-head sculptures depicting kelpies (shape-shifting water spirits), located between Falkirk and Grangemouth, standing next to a new extension to the Forth and Clyde Canal, and near River Carron, in The Helix, a new parkland project built to connect sixteen communities in the Falkirk Council Area, Scotland. The sculptures were designed by sculptor Andy Scott and were completed in October 2013. The sculptures form a gateway at the eastern entrance to the Forth and Clyde canal, and the new canal extension built as part of The Helix land transformation project. The Kelpies are a monument to horse-powered heritage across Scotland.

The sculptures were opened to the public in April 2014. As part of the project, they have their own visitors‘ centre, and sit beside a newly developed canal turning pool and extension. This canal extension reconnects the Forth and Clyde Canal with the River Forth, and improves navigation between the East and West of Scotland.

History

The name was chosen by Scottish Canals at the inception of The Helix project, in 2005. The Kelpies name reflected the mythological transforming beasts possessing the strength and endurance of ten horses; a quality that is analogous with the transformational change and endurance of Scotland's inland waterways. The Kelpies represent the lineage of the heavy horse of Scottish industry and economy, pulling the wagons, ploughs, barges, and coalships that shaped the geographical layout of the Falkirk area.

According to sculptor Andy Scott, "The original concept of mythical water horses was a valid starting point for the artistic development of the structures." He also said that he “took that concept and moved with it towards a more equine and contemporary response, shifting from any mythological references towards a socio-historical monument intended to celebrate the horse’s role in industry and agriculture as well as the obvious association with the canals as tow horses”. In 2008 Scott created three-metre-high miniature versions in his Glasgow studio. These were then scanned by lasers to help the steel fabricators create accurate full-scale components.

According to Scott the end result would be "[w]ater-borne, towering gateways into The Helix, the Forth and Clyde Canal and Scotland, translating the legacy of the area into proud equine guardians".

During the first year following the opening, nearly one million people visited the sculptures.

The first routine maintenance and cleaning was carried out by a high-wire team in the summer of 2017.

Structure

Built of structural steel with a stainless steel cladding, The Kelpies are 30 metres high and weigh 300 tonnes each. Construction began in June 2013 and was complete by October 2013. The Kelpies are positioned either side of a specially constructed lock and basin, part of the redeveloped Kelpies Hub. The forms are inspired by Clydesdale (draught) horses.

Maquettes

There are two sets of 1:10 scale maquettes. These have been displayed locally, nationally, and internationally at events and locations including Edinburgh Airport, the Field Museum in Grant Park, Chicago, The Falkirk Wheel, Expo 2011 (Aberdeen), Expo 2012 (Edinburgh) and Expo 2013 (Glasgow), BBC Scotland, Glasgow, Kirkcudbright Arts & Crafts Trail 2017, University of Glasgow, Sheffield International Steel Celebration, and later at Bryant Park in New York.

Sculpted from steel then galvanized using a hot dip process, the Kelpie maquettes were welded by hand from small plates of steel.

In the media
 The judges of the British Constructional Steelwork Association's Structural Steel Design Awards 2014 said the structures required "considerable engineering finesse".
 The Courier wrote that "Scots are being offered a tantalising glimpse of two staggering sculptures that will help transform the landscape of central Scotland."
 The Guardian reported that "They will create one of the most dramatic gateways through which to enter Britain".
 The New Civil Engineer website defined the Kelpies as "one of Scotland’s most complex sculptures"
 The Ordnance Survey described them as "amazing and dramatic".
 Tiffany Jenkins on The Scotsman wrote that "They are impressive, stunning even, and I think people will become attached to them and proud of them. Of course, they will not please everyone, but that it is not possible as no such art work exists".
 Jonathan Jones, writing in The Guardian, described them as "the latest misbegotten 'masterpiece' of public art. It is big. It is bold. And it is rotten. [...] The Kelpies is just a kitsch exercise in art 'for the people', carefully stripped of difficulty, controversy, and meaning."

References

External links

 
 
 Images of The Kelpies from the BBC

Outdoor sculptures in Scotland
Horses in art
2013 sculptures
Buildings and structures in Falkirk (council area)
Steel sculptures in the United Kingdom
Stainless steel sculptures
Colossal statues in the United Kingdom